Michael John Esposito (born April 24, 1953) is a former American football running back in the National Football League. He played for the Atlanta Falcons. He attended Wilmington High School in Massachusetts and played college football for the Boston College Eagles.

Esposito was a participant in the 1974 East–West Shrine Game. As part of the game, each player would visit the Shriners Hospitals for Children. While visiting, he noticed Nicole Worley-Urteaga, a 2-year-old patient with Holt-Oram syndrome. She appeared scared and was crying. Esposito took her hand to calm her down and they walked down the hallway together. A photographer from a local newspaper noticed the scene and snapped a photo of the two. The image became the inspiration for the official logo of the East-West Shrine Game and is displayed annually on the 50-yard line.

References

1953 births
Living people
American football running backs
Atlanta Falcons players
Boston College Eagles football players
Sportspeople from Everett, Massachusetts
Players of American football from Massachusetts